Katherine Neville (c. 1397 – late summer 1483) was a medieval English noblewoman, the eldest daughter of Ralph Neville, 1st Earl of Westmorland, and his second wife Joan Beaufort. Through her mother, she was a granddaughter of John of Gaunt.

First marriage
On 12 January 1412, Katherine was married at the age of 15 to John Mowbray, 2nd Duke of Norfolk (1392–1432). Their only known child was John de Mowbray, 3rd Duke of Norfolk (1415–1461).

Second marriage
Katherine married for a second time to Thomas Strangeways (c. 1395-before 1442) - they had 2 daughters:
 Joan Strangeways, who first married Sir William Willoughby, before 20 July 1461. Their daughter Cecily married Edward Sutton, 2nd Baron Dudley. They were ancestors of Herbert Hoover, among many others. Joan married for a second time to William Berkeley in November 1468; they had one son, Thomas, and one daughter, Katherine.
 Katherine Strangeways, who married Henry Grey, 4th (7th) Baron Grey of Codnor, 29 August 1454.

Third marriage
She married for a third time to John, Viscount Beaumont, in 1442, who was killed in 1460 at the battle of Northampton. He was also the first viscount in England.

Fourth marriage
Her fourth and last marriage was infamous, known by contemporaries as the "diabolical marriage". She married John Woodville, brother of Queen Elizabeth. Chronicler William Worcester referred to the match as being rotting revenge for both parties "vindicta Bernardi inter cosdem postem putrit". He was 19 years old at the time of their marriage, while she was 65. Nonetheless, she survived him, as he was executed in 1469 after the Battle of Edgecote, on the orders of her nephew Richard Neville, 16th Earl of Warwick, during a Lancastrian rebellion against Edward IV. Whether or not she was forced into her final marriage against her will is unclear, but the unsavoury details added to the deep dislike of the Queen's family among the ruling class, which greatly weakened the Yorkist dynasty.

Death
She was still alive in 1483, having survived all her children. She was last seen in public at the coronation of Richard III.

Ancestry

Footnotes

References
 
Green, Mary Anne Everett. Letters of Royal and Illustrious Ladies of Great Britain, From the Commencement of the Twelfth Century to the Close of the Reign of Queen Mary.  London: H. Colburn, 1846. googlebooks Retrieved December 13, 2008
Oxford History of England, 1399–1485, 485ff.
Kennedy, Maev. The Bones of a King: Richard III Rediscovered. Germany, Wiley, 2015
Richardson, Douglas  Plantagenet Ancestry: A Study in Colonial and Medieval Families, 2nd Edition, 2011

External links
 Katherine Neville profile, our-royal-titled-noble-and-commoner-ancestors.com. Accessed 24 November 2022.
 Neville family genealogy site, tudorplace.com.ar. Accessed 14 December 2022.

1390s births
1483 deaths
Date of birth unknown
14th-century English women
14th-century English people
15th-century English women
15th-century English people
Daughters of British earls
Wives of knights
Katherine Neville
Beaumont
Katherine